The 63rd World Science Fiction Convention (Worldcon), also known as Interaction, was held on 4–8 August 2005 at the SEC Centre with the attached SEC Armadillo and Moat House Hotel in Glasgow, United Kingdom. Parties took place at the Hilton Hotel.

The organising committee was co-chaired by Colin Harris and Vincent Docherty.

This convention was also the 2005 Eurocon.

Participants 

Attendance was 4,115, out of 5,202 paid memberships. The members represented 35 different nationalities, of which the largest contingents were from the United States and the United Kingdom.

Guests of Honour 

 Greg Pickersgill
 Christopher Priest
 Robert Sheckley
 Lars-Olov Strandberg
 Jane Yolen

Special guests 

 Alan Lee
 Professor David Southwood

Participating writers and artists 

In addition to the guests of honour, notable participating science fiction and fantasy writers and artists included:

Awards

2005 Hugo Awards 

 Best Novel: Jonathan Strange & Mr Norrell by Susanna Clarke
 Best Novella: The Concrete Jungle by Charles Stross
 Best Novelette: "The Faery Handbag" by Kelly Link
 Best Short Story: "Travels with My Cats" by Mike Resnick
 Best Related Book: The Cambridge Companion to Science Fiction, edited by Edward James and Farah Mendlesohn
 Best Dramatic Presentation, Long Form: The Incredibles, written & directed by Brad Bird
 Best Dramatic Presentation, Short Form: "33", Battlestar Galactica
 Best Professional Editor: Ellen Datlow
 Best Professional Artist: Jim Burns
 Best Semiprozine: Ansible, edited by David Langford
 Best Fanzine: Plokta, edited by Alison Scott, Steve Davies and Mike Scott
 Best Fan Writer: David Langford
 Best Fan Artist: Sue Mason
 Best Website: SciFiction (SciFiction), edited by Ellen Datlow. general manager Craig Engler

Other awards 

 John W. Campbell Award for Best New Writer: Elizabeth Bear
 Special Interaction Committee Award: David Pringle
 Eurocon Awards – Best European Magazine: Galaktika

Future site selection 

Due to the changes in the World Science Fiction Society rules, which reduced the lead time from three to two years, no Worldcon site selection took place at this convention. The site for the 2007 Worldcon was decided at the 2004 Worldcon in Boston under the old three year lead-time rule. The site selection for the 2008 Worldcon, the first under the new two year lead-time rule, took place at the 2006 Worldcon in Anaheim.

See also 

 Hugo Award
 Science fiction
 Speculative fiction
 World Science Fiction Society
 Worldcon

References

External links 

 Homepage of Interaction
 World Science Fiction Society

2000s in Glasgow
2005 conferences
2005 in Scotland
History of Glasgow
Science fiction conventions in Europe
Science fiction conventions in the United Kingdom
Scottish science fiction
Worldcon